Smartsheet Inc. is an American publicly-listed company that develops and markets the Smartsheet application. As of 2022, it had over 2,600 employees, and is headquartered in Bellevue, Washington The company was founded in the summer of 2005, shortly after co-founder Brent Frei sold his prior company, Onyx Software. Initially it was funded mostly by Frei. About a year after its founding, Smartsheet had raised $4 million in funding and had just nine employees. By early 2012 it had raised $8.2 million in funding over three rounds and hired its first salesperson.

After the Smartsheet software was redesigned in 2010, the company's revenues grew by more than 100 percent each year, for four consecutive years. It raised $26 million in funding in December 2012 and another $35 million in May 2014. In 2017, the company raised an additional $52.1 million in funding. In 2018, it was announced that Smartsheet acquired Converse.AI, a Scotland-based company that develops software for creating business automation bots.

The company began trading on the New York Stock Exchange on April 27, 2018. In May 2019, Smartsheet announced it had acquired 10,000 ft, a SaaS platform that provides real-time resource and capacity planning.

Executive Team 

 Mark P. Mader - President, CEO & Director
 Michael J. Arntz - Chief Revenue Officer & Exec. VP of Worldwide Field Operations
 Megan Hansen - Chief People and Culture Officer
 Pete Godbole - Chief Financial Officer
 Jolene Marshall - Chief Legal Officer & Secretary
 Andrew Bennett - Chief Marketing Officer
 Gene Farrell - Chief Product Officer
 Praerit Garg - Chief Technology Officer
 Chris Peake - Chief Information Security Officer

Source:

References

External links

2018 initial public offerings
Companies listed on the New York Stock Exchange
Companies based in Bellevue, Washington
American companies established in 2006
Software companies based in Washington (state)
Software companies of the United States